Idiosepius paradoxus, also known as the northern pygmy squid, is a species of bobtail squid native to the western Pacific Ocean, including the waters off South Korea, northern Australia, as well as the Japanese islands of Honshu, Kyushu, and southern Hokkaidō. It inhabits shallow, inshore waters.

Description
Individuals of this species have a unique organ found on their dorsal mantle for binding themselves to a substrate.

The type specimen was collected off Kadsiyama in Tokyo Bay. It is deposited at the Musee Zoologique in Strasbourg.

Distribution and habitat
The squid is found in the demersal zone in subtropical climates. It resides in algae, seagrass, and seaweed.

References

Further reading
Kasugai, T. 2001.   J. Mar. Biol. Assoc. U. K. 81: 979–981.
Kasugai, T. & Y. Ikeda 2003.   Veliger (Calif. Malacozoological Soc. Inc., Santa Barbara) 46(2): 105–110.
 Natsukari, Y. 1970. Egg-laying behavior, embryonic development and hatched larva of the pygmy cuttlefish Idiosepius pygmaeus paradoxus Ortmann. Bulletin of the Faculty of Fisheries, Nagasaki University 30: 15–29.
Shigeno, S. & M. Yamamoto 2002.   Journal of Morphology 254: 65–80.
Yamamoto, M. 1988. Normal embryonic stages of the pygmy cuttlefish, Idiosepius pygmaeus paradoxus Ortmann. Zoological Science 5(5): 989–998.
Yamamoto, M., Y. Shimazaki & S. Shigeno 2003.   Zoological Science (Zoological Society of Japan) 20: 163–179.

External links

Bobtail squid
Molluscs described in 1888